Benjamin Björn Rubinstein (April 12, 1905 – July 12, 1989) was a Finnish Jewish–American physician and psychoanalyst.

Career
Benjamin B. Rubinstein was born in the Jewish community of Helsinki, Finland, and he attended school both in his home town and in Copenhagen. His native language was Swedish. In Helsinki University, he studied first history and philosophy, but after having read Totem and Taboo by Sigmund Freud, he changed to the Faculty of Medicine in order to become a psychoanalyst. He also worked as a research assistant to Ragnar Granit.

Rubinstein attained the degree of Licentiate in Medicine in 1936, and studied neurology and psychiatry in the United Kingdom in 1937–1939. His supervising analyst was Eva Rosenfeld, a student of Freud.

When the Winter War broke out in 1939, Rubinstein returned to Finland and served as a medic and a psychiatrist in the army. He married his cousin Dinorah Rosenthal in 1940.

In 1947, Rubinstein and his wife moved to the United States to be educated at the Menninger Foundation in Topeka, Kansas, until 1953. Then he opened a private analytical practice in New York. Rubinstein and his wife become naturalized U.S. citizens in 1957.

Benjamin B. Rubinstein wrote extensively on the philosophy of psychoanalysis, including articles on the mind–body dichotomy, motivation, metaphor, the logic of psychoanalytic explanations, and metapsychology. His collected papers were published in 1997: Psychoanalysis and the Philosophy of Science: Collected Papers of Benjamin B. Rubinstein, M.D.

Sources

Literature
 Holt, Robert R. 1997: Editor's Introduction: The Life and Work of Benjamin Bjorn Rubinstein. — Psychoanalysis and the Philosophy of Science: Collected Papers of Benjamin B. Rubinstein, M.D. (edited by Robert R. Holt), pp. 1–21. International Universities Press, Madison. 
 Ihanus, Juhani 2018: Benjamin B. Rubinstein — A Finnish-American Psychoanalyst. Clio’s Psyche, 24 (2): pp. 162–166. 
 Ihanus, Juhani & Talvitie, Vesa 2007: Benjamin Rubinstein — psykoanalyysin tuntematon suuri suomalainen. — Psykoterapia 4, pp. 226–242. (On-line version.)

Notes

External links
 International Dictionary of Psychoanalysis

1905 births
1989 deaths
Physicians from Helsinki
People from Uusimaa Province (Grand Duchy of Finland)
Finnish Jews
Psychoanalysts
Finnish military doctors
American people of Finnish-Jewish descent
University of Helsinki alumni
Swedish-speaking Finns
Finnish emigrants to the United States
Finnish psychiatrists
Jewish psychoanalysts
20th-century Finnish physicians